Hamish F. G. Swanston (1933 – 8 September 2013), theologian and historian, was born in Great Yarmouth at Swanston House. His family originated from Swanston near Edinburgh. He was ordained as a Roman Catholic priest in 1960. At the University of Kent at Canterbury in 1977, he became the first Catholic to head a Department of Theology at a British university since the Reformation. He lectured regularly on various topics, notably including seventeenth and eighteenth century European opera, on which he has spoken at the Kennedy Center and the Los Angeles Opera Center.

Selected works
His publications include:

Community Witness
Ideas of Order
A Language for Madness
Studies in the Sacraments (two volumes)
In Defence of Opera
Handel
Celebrating Eternity Now: A Study in the Theology of St Alphonsus de Liguori

References

1933 births
2013 deaths
British theologians
People from Oban
People from Great Yarmouth